is a former Japanese football player.

Playing career
Hamaoka was born in Nagasaki Prefecture on February 28, 1981. After graduating from high school, he joined newly was promoted to J2 League club, Oita Trinita in 1999. On August 1, he debuted as substitute midfielder from the 83rd minute against Montedio Yamagata. However he could hardly play in the match until 2000. In 2001, he moved to newly was promoted to Japan Football League (JFL) club, Ehime FC. He became a regular player and played many matches as midfielder. The club also won the champions in 2005 and was promoted to J2 from 2006. In 2007, he moved to JFL club Sagawa Printing and played as regular player in 1 season. In 2008, he moved to Regional Leagues club Banditonce Kakogawa and played in 1 season. After 1 year blank, he joined JFL club Tochigi Uva FC in 2010. He played many matches as regular player in 4 seasons. In 2014, he moved to Regional Leagues club Nara Club in 2014. In July he moved to JFL club MIO Biwako Shiga. In 2015, he moved to JFL club Tochigi Uva FC again. He played as regular player and left the club in August 2016.

Club statistics

References

External links

1981 births
Living people
Association football people from Nagasaki Prefecture
Japanese footballers
J2 League players
Japan Football League players
Oita Trinita players
Ehime FC players
SP Kyoto FC players
Tochigi City FC players
Nara Club players
MIO Biwako Shiga players
Association football midfielders